The 2019 Florida Cup was the fifth edition of Florida Cup, a friendly association football tournament played in the United States. The competition is partnered with Universal Orlando Resort.

Teams

Venues

Standings

Matches

References

External links

2019
2019 in American soccer
January 2019 sports events in the United States
2019 in sports in Florida